Winner Is King is an upcoming Chinese television series based on the BL historical novel Sha Po Lang by Priest starring Tan Jianci, Chen Zheyuan, Li Hongyi, and Sun Anke. The series is expected to air on Tencent Video with 45 episodes.

Synopsis 
In the age of the Great Liang Dynasty, the Kingdom of Northern Xuan gained a short reprieve after a war. Chang Geng ( Chen Zheyuan ), who resides in a small town, was attacked by a pack of wolves during an outing but was saved by Shen Shiliu ( Tan Jianci ). To repay his kindness, Chang Geng acknowledges him as his foster-father. The enemy forces, the Heavenly Wolf tribe, waited for an opportunity to invade and set off a war. In a critical moment, Chang Geng discovers that he is the fourth prince of Northern Xuan, and Shen Shiliu is Gu Yun, the commander of Xuan Tie army. Gu Yun defeated the Heavenly Wolf tribe and escorted Chang Geng to the capital city.

The current Emperor of Northern Xuan passes away, and Li Feng ascended the throne as the new Emperor. However, his foundation is not yet stable. The ambitious Prince of Wei is eyeing his throne and saw this as an opportunity to create a crisis. Li Feng, wary of Gu Yun's military prowess, sends Gu Yun to guard the borders. Chang Geng also chose to join the Lin Yuan Pavilion and followed the experts of the pavilion around the world to travel and experience life. After several years, he grew up into a someone with lofty ambitions and a talent for governing. At this time, Northern Xuan faces both internal and external problems. Chang Geng returns to the capital and uses his knowledge and newfound skills to assist the Emperor in securing his reign. However, problems continuously pour in, such as rebellion by the inner court officials, assassination of Li Feng and attack of Jiang Nan by external forces. At last, Chang Geng manages to ascend the throne and resurrect Northern Bei, fulfilling his vision of world peace.

Cast

Main  
Tan Jianci as Gu Yun / Shen Shiliu
Chen Zheyuan as Chang Geng 
Li Hong Yi as Shen Yi
Sun Anke as Chen Qingxu

Production
In December 2019, Ciwen Media announced that the script has already been completed. It would retain the elements of steampunk in the novel, such as Mecha, giant kites and Heavy iron. The series began filming in Xiangshan Film and Television Town in July 2020. It is directed by Zhou Yuanzhou, who also directed the 2018 series Guardian.

References 

2020s Chinese television series
Television shows based on Chinese novels
Chinese web series
Tencent original programming
Television series by Tencent Penguin Pictures
Upcoming television series